Gaubert is a French surname. Notable people with the surname include:

Danielle Gaubert (1943–1987), French actress
Jean Gaubert, French politician
Jeremy Gaubert, American poker player
Patrick Gaubert, French politician
Philippe Gaubert (1879–1941), French musician

See also
Saint Waldebert

French-language surnames